Cyclic AMP receptors  from slime molds are a distinct family of 
G-protein coupled receptors. These receptors control development in
Dictyostelium discoideum.

In D. discoideum, the cyclic AMP receptors coordinate aggregation of individual cells into a multicellular organism, and regulate the expression of a large number of developmentally-regulated genes. The amino acid sequences of the receptors contain high proportions of hydrophobic residues grouped into 7 domains, in a manner reminiscent of the rhodopsins and other receptors believed to interact with G-proteins. However, while a similar 3D framework has been proposed to account for this, there is no significant sequence similarity between these families: the cAMP receptors thus bear their own unique '7TM' signature.

See also
 cAMP receptor protein

References

G protein-coupled receptors
Protein domains
Protein families
Membrane proteins